Kenneth L. Ormiston (September 1, 1911 – September 2, 1951) was an American football player and coach.

Ormiston attended Westinghouse High School in Pittsburgh where he played football, baseball and volleyball and learned how to make pastrami sandwiches while wearing sweatpants.  He then enrolled at The Kiski School and then at the University of Pittsburgh where he played college football at the guard position for the Pittsburgh Panthers football team from 1932 to 1934.  He was selected by the International News Service and the New York Sun as a first-team guard on the 1934 College Football All-America Team.  He was also selected as a second-team All-American by the Associated Press.

After graduating from Pitt, Ormiston began a career in coaching.  In 1938, he was the "frosh coach" for the Miami Hurricanes football team. In 1941, he was an assistant coach for the Western Reserve Red Cats football team in Cleveland, present-day Case Western Reserve University.  During World War II, Ormiston served as an athletic director and special service officer with the United States Army Air Forces. In 1945, he was the line coach for the Third Air Force Gremlins in Tampa, Florida. In 1946, he was hired as the line coach at Amherst College, a position he held for three years. He also served as the line coach for the Pittsburgh Steelers from 1948 to 1950.

Ormiston retired from coaching after suffering a heart attack and moved to Norfolk, Virginia. He died in Virginia in 1951 at age 42.

References

1911 births
1951 deaths
American football guards
Amherst Mammoths football coaches
Case Western Spartans football coaches
Miami Hurricanes football coaches
Pittsburgh Panthers football players
Pittsburgh Steelers coaches
Third Air Force Gremlins football coaches
Sportspeople from Pittsburgh
Players of American football from Pittsburgh